Francesco Benussi (born 15 October 1981) is a retired Italian footballer who played as a goalkeeper.

Club career

Venezia
Benussi started his career at Venezia, After he made his team debut in 1999–2000 season. He was loaned to Serie C1 clubs likes Lumezzane and Ascoli. After played as a backup of Giovanni Indiveri, he returned to Venice and played as a backup of Salvatore Soviero before left on loan again for Arezzo of Serie C1. Benussi became first choice after Soviero departed for Reggina.

Lecce
After Venezia bankruptcy and relegated, Benussi was signed by Lecce, as first a backup to Vincenzo Sicignano in August 2005. But due to injury of Sicignano, he played 15 Serie A games. Lecce failed to protect her place in Serie A, and saw Sicignano left the club. Benussi became the first choice at the start of 2004–05 season, before left on loan to A.C. Siena as player exchange with Nicola Pavarini. At Siena, he failed to challenge Alex Manninger for the first choice, and Siena has not decided to bought Benussi outright.

Returned to Lecce for another Serie B season, his first choice place was challenged by Antonio Rosati but Benussi played 23 Serie B games and all 4 promotion playoffs, to win promotion for the Apulia club in June 2008.

Livorno
On 12 August 2009 Livorno have signed the goalkeeper on loan from U.S. Lecce. He played as an unused substitute on 9 August, in the Coppa Italia match that Lecce won 4–0 over Vico Equense.

On 25 October 2009, he played his first match for Livorno, substituted Nico Pulzetti after goalkeeper Alfonso De Lucia was sent off. He played as starter in the subsequent 3 league matches and 2 Coppa Italia games.

Palermo and loan to Torino
On 1 February 2010 Benussi agreed for a loan transfer to Palermo, with Rubinho making the opposite move, reunited with former 	Venezia owner Maurizio Zamparini. After Palermo signed Giacomo Brichetto permanently, Benussi also signed permanently from Lecce a week later, on 22 July 2010. He signed a 3-year contract.

Constantly a second choice behind Italian international Salvatore Sirigu, Benussi has since played only at UEFA Europa League level during his period while at Palermo. Initially confirmed as second goalkeeper following the departure of Sirigu to Paris Saint-Germain F.C. and the signing of Greek international Alexandros Tzorvas as a replacement, he successively became the first choice under new head coaches Devis Mangia and Bortolo Mutti. Following the acquisition of Italy international Emiliano Viviano, Palermo opted to send Benussi on loan to Torino in the Serie B league.

Udinese
On 24 July 2013, his contract with Palermo was cancelled and he moved to Udinese.

Verona
On 30 August 2014 Benussi was signed by Hellas Verona F.C.

Carpi
On 9 July 2015 Benussi was signed by Serie A newcomer Carpi F.C. 1909. On 27 January 2016 Benussi was released.

Vicenza
Benussi joined Vicenza Calcio in a -year contract on 27 January 2016 on a free transfer. He received no.1 shirt from departing Richard Marcone.

International career
Benussi has been capped for the Italy U20 side in 2000 at the Toulon Tournament, behind Generoso Rossi as 2nd choice goalkeeper. He played once at the tournament.

Honours
Lecce
Serie B Third-Place: 2007–08

Ascoli
Serie C1 Champions: 2001–02

References

External links
 Francesco Benussi Interview

1981 births
Living people
Italian footballers
Italy youth international footballers
Venezia F.C. players
Ascoli Calcio 1898 F.C. players
S.S. Arezzo players
U.S. Lecce players
A.C.N. Siena 1904 players
U.S. Livorno 1915 players
Palermo F.C. players
Torino F.C. players
Udinese Calcio players
Hellas Verona F.C. players
A.C. Carpi players
Serie A players
Serie B players
Serie C players
Association football goalkeepers
Footballers from Venice
People from Mestre-Carpenedo